José António Rocha Garrido (born 11 July 1960) is a Portuguese football manager and former footballer who played as a centre-back. He is the current manager of Saudi club Al-Qaisumah.

Managerial career
Garrido's early managerial career was spent in the lower leagues of Portuguese football. In May 2003, he took over at F.C. Penafiel, three points above relegation from Segunda Liga, for the final four games before beginning a contract at third-tier F.C. Vizela. Following a year there, he moved abroad to Sabah FA of Malaysia in November 2004, and Kuwaiti duo Kazma SC and Qadsia SC. In 2010, he won the Bahraini King's Cup for Riffa SC, ending a 12-year drought in that competition.

In January 2011, Garrido was back in his own country for the first time in seven years to take the helm again at Penafiel. On 6 March he was dismissed and replaced by Jorge Regadas.

Garrido went back to the Middle East, managing Dhofar Club (Oman), Al-Nasr SC (Kuwait) and a second spell at Riffa. He was appointed manager of the Gabon national football team in November 2016, after the dismissal of compatriot Jorge Costa. In the same month, he too was dismissed and replaced by José Antonio Camacho; he sued the Gabonese Football Federation for wrongful dismissal at the Court of Arbitration for Sport and received $514,000 compensation.

On 24 September 2019, Garrido was appointed as the manager of Saudi Arabian club Al-Batin. In his first season in charge he managed to win the MS League title and promotion to the Pro League.

On 28 June 2021, Garrido was appointed as the manager of Al-Jabalain.

On 26 January 2023, Garrido was appointed as the manager of Al-Qaisumah.

Honours

Manager
Al-Batin
MS League: 2019–20

References

External links 
 José Garrido at thefinalball.com
 José Garrido profile at ForaDeJogo

1960 births
Living people
Footballers from Luanda
Angolan people of Portuguese descent
Angolan footballers
Portuguese footballers
Association football defenders
Segunda Divisão players
Gil Vicente F.C. players
Primeira Liga players
G.D. Chaves players
S.L. Benfica footballers
Boavista F.C. players
F.C. Famalicão players
Liga Portugal 2 players
C.D. Aves players
Olympic footballers of Portugal
Portuguese football managers
A.D. Lousada managers
F.C. Penafiel managers
Sabah F.C. (Malaysia) managers
Kazma SC managers
Qadsia SC managers
Dhofar Club managers
Gabon national football team managers
Expatriate football managers in Malaysia
Expatriate football managers in Kuwait
Expatriate football managers in Bahrain
Expatriate football managers in Oman
Expatriate football managers in Gabon
Expatriate football managers in Saudi Arabia
Portuguese expatriate football managers
Portuguese expatriate sportspeople in Malaysia
Portuguese expatriate sportspeople in Bahrain
Portuguese expatriate sportspeople in Oman
Portuguese expatriate sportspeople in Saudi Arabia
Al Batin FC managers
Al-Nasr SC (Kuwait) managers
F.C. Vizela managers
Kuwait Premier League managers
Saudi First Division League managers
Portuguese expatriate sportspeople in Kuwait
Portuguese expatriate sportspeople in Gabon